Nothing but Thieves is the debut studio album by English alternative rock band Nothing but Thieves. It was released on 16 October 2015 in the UK through Sony Music Entertainment, and on 5 February 2016 in the US through RCA Victor. It was produced by Julian Emery, with additional production by Jim Irvin, Dominic Craik and Larry Hibbitt, and mixes by Cenzo Townshend and Adam Noble. The cover art is a photograph by Miriam Sweeney, titled 'Subversion'

Commercial performance 
As of May 4, 2017, the album has sold over 250,000 copies, and accumulated 174 million track streams.

Track listing

Personnel

Nothing but Thieves
Conor Mason – vocals
Joseph Langridge-Brown – guitars
Dominic Craik – guitars, keyboard
Philip Blake – bass
James Price – drums

Technical personnel
Julian Emery – production
Jim Irvin – additional production
Dominic Craik – additional production
Larry Hibbitt – additional production
Cenzo Townshend – mixing
Adam Noble – mixing
Robin Schmidt – mastering
Steve Stacey – art direction

Charts and certifications

Certifications

References

2015 debut albums
Nothing but Thieves albums